Marius Corbett (born 26 September 1975 in Potchefstroom) is a South African javelin thrower. He won a surprise gold medal at the 1997 World Championships in Athletics, improving his personal best by 4.50 m during the contest. The following year he threw  to win the 1998 Commonwealth Games, which stands as the Commonwealth Games Record and was also the African record until Julius Yego's throw of 91.39 on 7 June 2015 in Birmingham.

After his retirement from athletics he played 1st Division Currie Cup Rugby in South Africa.

Seasonal bests by year
1993 - 73.00
1994 - 77.98
1996 - 74.94
1997 - 88.40
1998 - 88.75
1999 - 87.17
2000 - 83.43
2001 - 80.91
2004 - 70.17

International competitions

External links

1975 births
Living people
People from Potchefstroom
South African male javelin throwers
Commonwealth Games gold medallists for South Africa
Commonwealth Games medallists in athletics
Athletes (track and field) at the 1998 Commonwealth Games
World Athletics Championships athletes for South Africa
World Athletics Championships medalists
African Games gold medalists for South Africa
African Games medalists in athletics (track and field)
Universiade medalists in athletics (track and field)
Athletes (track and field) at the 1999 All-Africa Games
Universiade gold medalists for South Africa
World Athletics Championships winners
Medalists at the 1997 Summer Universiade
Medallists at the 1998 Commonwealth Games